The Jayamatha Engineering College is located in Aralvaimozhi in the Kanyakumari district of Muppandal in Tamil Nadu, India

The college grew out of The Selvam Educational and Charitable Trust and Rajas Educational and charitable trust, under the chairmanship of philanthropist Dr. S.A. Raja.

References 

Engineering colleges in Tamil Nadu
Universities and colleges in Kanyakumari district